Karađoz Bey Mosque is a 16th-century Ottoman mosque in the city of Mostar, Bosnia and Herzegovina.

With its big dome and high minaret it is one of the largest mosques in the region.

History 
The Karađoz Bey mosque was built on the foundations of the Catholic church of Saint Stephen the Protomartyr.

An Arabic foundation inscription on the mosque records that it was commissioned by Mehmed Beg b. Abu al-Saʿadat’ who was a brother of a vizier in the year AH 965 (1557–58). Some scholars have claimed that the vizier was the grand vizier Rüstem Pasha, but Rüstem Pasha is recorded as having only a single brother, Sinan Pasha. 

The mosque may have been designed by the imperial architect Mimar Sinan. It is in the form of a domed cube fronted by a double portico. The three domes of the inner portico are supported by four marble columns. The outer portico has a shed roof resting on small octagonal pillars. The large  dome of the mosque sits on an octagonal fenestrated drum which is supported by eight-pointed arches.

The mosque was severely damaged during World War II, and faced near destruction during the Bosnian War in the early 1990s. However, Karađoz Bey Mosque, like the rest of Mostar, underwent extensive repairs between 2002 and 2004. The mosque was completely renovated and reopened to the public in July 2004.

References

Books

Journals

Notes 

Mosques in Bosnia and Herzegovina
Mosques converted from churches in the Ottoman Empire
Church buildings converted to a different denomination
Attacks on religious buildings and structures during the Bosnian War
Ottoman mosques in Bosnia and Herzegovina
Mimar Sinan buildings
16th-century mosques
National Monuments of Bosnia and Herzegovina
Buildings and structures in Mostar
Medieval Bosnia and Herzegovina architecture